Brusartsi is a town in Northwestern Bulgaria. It is located in Montana Province and is 23 km away from the town of Lom. The town is the administrative center of the homonymous Brusartsi Municipality. As of December 2009, Brusartsi has a population of 1,302 inhabitants.
  
Main train lines Mezdra-Vidin and Lom-Mezdra make stops here. Roads link to Lom, Montana, Vidin and Belogradchik.

Geography
Located in the western part of the hilly Danube Plain on the side of the river "Nechinska bara". A height of 100 m. Temperate climate.

Politics
 2007 - Yulia Kamenova (Coalition "Unity" - NMS, GERB) won the second round with 50.50 percent against Demi Dimitrov (BSP).
 2003 - Yulia Kamenova (NMS) won the second round with 54 percent against Demi Dimitrov (BSP).
 1999 - Georgi Georgiev (UDF) won the second round with 55 percent against Demi Dimitrov (BSP coalition and local).
 1995 - Demi Dimitrov (BSP election coalition, BANU Alexander Str, Ecoglasnost Political Club) won the first round with 56 percent against Arsenov Assen (National Union).

Cultural and Natural Attractions
 Monastery of St. Archangel Michael
 Church of St. Paraskeva

Regular Events
 Fair - Saturday and Sunday during the third week of August, in the central square.
 Market for animals and other goods, every Sunday.

People
 Violeta Kondova - A participant in Big Brother 3
 Professor Peter Lukanov - Dancer

Other

Kitchen
Sauerkraut with pork, dried chili beans, banitsa with pumpkin and banitsa with apples.

References

External links
 Official website of the Brusartsi Municipality.
 Regional Information Portal
 Radio and Television in Brusartsi

Towns in Bulgaria
Populated places in Montana Province